The Hotel Vendome Fire Memorial commemorates victims of the Hotel Vendome fire. It is installed along Boston's Commonwealth Avenue Mall, in the U.S. state of Massachusetts. The work was designed by the artist Ted Clausen and landscape architect Peter White. A group of firefighters originally proposed the memorial in 1982, but it was not initially approved by the Boston Arts Commission. The rejected proposal led to claims that the affluent residents of Back Bay had thwarted the proposal out of snobbery, regarding the design as "tacky." The Boston Globe columnist Mike Barnicle attributed the obstruction to the "elitism and self-importance" of those in the neighborhood. The design was finally approved in 1995 and ground was broken the following year.

References

Back Bay, Boston
Monuments and memorials in Boston
Outdoor sculptures in Boston